South Pill is a suburb of Saltash in the civil parish of Saltash, east Cornwall, England, the word "pill" deriving from a tidal pool related to the estuary of the River Tamar.

References

Populated places in Cornwall